Halve Maen was a Dutch East India Company vlieboot (similar to a carrack) that sailed into what is now New York Harbor in September 1609. She was commissioned by the VOC Chamber of Amsterdam in the Dutch Republic to covertly find a western passage to China. The ship was captained by Henry Hudson, an Englishman in the service of the Dutch Republic.

In 1909, the Kingdom of the Netherlands presented the United States with a replica of Halve Maen to commemorate the 300th anniversary of Hudson's voyage; the replica was destroyed in a fire in 1934. Fifty years later, the New Netherland Museum commissioned a second replica.

History

Halve Maen sailed from Amsterdam to the Arctic, turning southwest to traverse the Atlantic Ocean to North America, then sailed from Newfoundland to the south in search of the Northwest Passage.

In his 1625 book New World, which contains invaluable extracts from Hudson's lost journal, Johannes de Laet, a director of the West India Company, writes that they "bent their course to the south until, running south-southwest and southwest by south, they again made land in latitude 41° 43’, which they supposed to be an island, and gave it the name of New Holland, but afterwards discovered that it was Cape Cod".

From there they sailed south to the Chesapeake Bay and then went north along the coast navigating first the Delaware Bay and, subsequently, the bay of the river which Hudson named the Mauritius River, for Holland's Lord-Lieutenant Maurits. Halve Maen sailed up Hudson's river as far as Kinderhook, and the ship’s boat with five crew members ventured to the vicinity of present-day Albany, New York, where the crew determined the water was too narrow and too shallow for further progress.  Concluding then that the river was also not a passage to the west, Hudson exited the river, naming the natives that dwelled on either side of the Mauritius estuary the Manahata. Leaving the estuary, he sailed north-eastward, never realizing that what are now the islands of Manhattan and Long Island were islands, and crossed the Atlantic to England where he sailed into Dartmouth harbor with the Dutch East India Company ship and crew.

In 1618, or a few years after, the ship was destroyed during an English attack on Jakarta in the Dutch East Indies.

Replicas

1909 replica 
In 1909 a replica of Halve Maen was given to the United States by the Kingdom of the Netherlands on the occasion of the 300th anniversary of Hudson's voyage. The ship was constructed at the Rijksmarinewerf in Amsterdam. The keel was laid on 29 October 1908 and on 15 April 1909 the ship was launched and then transported to the US on the Holland America Lines freight liner Soestdijk in order to attend the 1909 Hudson-Fulton Celebration in New York, arriving in July. She appeared in a parade with the American replica ship Clermont celebrating Robert Fulton. This replica was eventually towed to Cohoes, New York and perished in a fire on 22 July 1934.

1989 replica
Another replica of Halve Maen (officially Anglicized as Half Moon) was constructed in Albany, New York in 1989 by the New Netherland Museum. The museum contracted with Nicholas S. Benton to design and build the replica. Benton, a master ship-rigger and shipwright, was president of the Rigging Gang of Middletown, Rhode Island, which specialized in colonial ship restoration and design. To prepare for building Half Moon, a $1 million project, he visited maritime museums in the Netherlands and the United States. After his death while assisting with the rigging of another vessel, the construction of the Half Moon was completed by the New Netherland Museum.

The year 2009 marked NY400, the 400th anniversary of Halve Maen'''s voyage. For the anniversary, the crown prince of the Netherlands and his wife were on board, as well as students from a Dutch school. This anniversary was marked in September 2009 with festivals, music, sailing ships parading around New York Harbor.

A non-for-profit organization, Half Moon is run by a crew of volunteers that range in age from their teens to octogenarians.

In April 2015 the ship was transported on loan to the Westfries Museum in Hoorn, Netherlands. In 2019, the Hoorn Council decided not to renew their lease. Today, Halve Maen is located in the Port of Volendam and open to the public at a permanent mooring. The replica took part in SAIL Amsterdam 2015.

 Weathervane 
At  in both height and length, the model of Halve Maen on top of the SUNY System Administration Building in Albany, New York, is claimed to be the largest working weathervane in North America.

In popular cultureHalve Maen'' is mentioned in the 1819 story of Rip Van Winkle by Washington Irving, when the protagonist ventures into the Catskill Mountains and discovers Henry Hudson and the ship's crew.

See also
Henry Hudson Park
History of Albany, New York

References

External links 

Official Half Moon website
The "Halve Maan (1608)" at VOCsite.NL 
Rediscovering Henry Hudson's Half Moon

1600s ships
Age of Discovery ships
Exploration ships of the Dutch Republic
Individual sailing vessels
New Netherland
Replica ships
Ships of the Dutch East India Company
Maritime history of the Dutch East India Company